How To: Absurd Scientific Advice for Common Real-World Problems is a book by Randall Munroe in which the author provides absurd suggestions based in scientific fact on ways to solve some common and some absurd problems. The book contains a range of possible real-world and absurd problems, each the focus of a single chapter. The book was released on September 3, 2019.

Production 
Munroe had the idea for How To while working on his 2014 book, What If?, which answered questions submitted by readers of Munroe's blog. While working on the book, Munroe started to think about problems that he would like to solve and the consequences of solving them in different ways.

While researching his answers for How To, Munroe investigated how to dry out a phone that has fallen in water. However, he could not find a reliable practical answer, and did not want to give readers bad information. Ultimately, Munroe decided to omit the question from his book.

As part of researching the chapter on "How to Catch a Drone", Munroe reached out to professional tennis player Serena Williams to knock a drone out of the sky by hitting it with a tennis ball. Williams' husband Alexis Ohanian piloted the drone, making it hover just over a tennis net, and Williams successfully batted it down on her third try.

How To is Munroe's third published book, after What If? in 2014 and Thing Explainer in 2015.

Chapters 
How To contains the following chapters, with each chapter exploring a range of solutions, both plausible and absurd, to a particular problem:

In between chapters, there are a few short answers: How to Listen to Music, How to Chase a Tornado, How to Go Places, How to Blow Out Birthday Candles, How to Walk a Dog, and How to Build a Highway.

Reception 
The book was received positively by critics. Stephen Shankland of CNET stated that it "will make you laugh as you learn". Shankland contended that How To forces the reader to "appreciate the glorious complexity of our universe and the amazing breadth of humanity’s effort to comprehend it" through its "hilariously edifying answers" to some everyday and some improbable questions. Publishers Weekly described the text as "generously laced with dry humor" with "Munroe’s comic stick-figure art [being an] added bonus."

References 

Nerd culture
2019 non-fiction books
Science books
Riverhead Books books